Follow Me Television is a multicultural community television channel, focusing on cultural events as well as other community programs.

Follow me Television is a guiding light of love and peace, and it brings some good news. Focusing more on youth, multicultural programmed of different forms.

This is an initiative by the professionals around the globe such as Australasian, Canadian, American, British, Nigerian, Middle Eastern, European and Indian. With the support of The North American Laity professional's forum. Follow Me brings good news among the people of good will. Follow Me TV will contribute to the growth of the migrant community in the North America, particularly emphasizing the development of the people of Kerala.

Making use of modern technology, follow me brings message of love and peace around the world. Follow me brings to you relevant, useful, delightful programs to educate, inform and support you in prayer and reflection.

References

External links
 Follow Me Television official website

Multicultural and ethnic mass media in Canada
Mass media in London, Ontario
Television channels and stations established in 2013
Companies based in London, Ontario
2013 establishments in Ontario